The following is a list of charter schools in Louisiana (including networks of such schools) grouped by parish.

Avoyelles Parish

 Avoyelles Public Charter School
 Louisiana School for the Agricultural Sciences
 Red River Charter Academy

Caddo Parish

 AMIkids Caddo
 Linwood Public Charter School
 Magnolia School of Excellence
 Pathways in Education - North Market

Calcasieu Parish

 Lake Charles Charter Academy
 Lake Charles College Prep
 Southwest Louisiana Charter School

Concordia Parish
 Delta Charter School

East Baton Rouge Parish 

 Advantage Charter Academy
 Arlington Preparatory Academy
 Basis Baton Rouge
 Baton Rouge Center for Visual and Performing Arts
 Baton Rouge University Preparatory Elementary School
 Children's Charter School
 Collegiate Academy
 Community School for Apprenticeship Learning
 Dalton Charter School
 Democracy Prep Baton Rouge Charter School
 Forest Heights Academy of Excellence
 GEO (Next Generation, Prep Academy, Prep Mid City)
 Glen Oaks Middle School
 Idea Schools (Bridge, Innovation, University Prep)
 Impact Charter Elementary School
 Inspire Charter Academy
 J.K. Haynes Elementary Charter School
 Kenilworth Science & Technology Charter School
 Louisiana Key Academy
 Louisiana Virtual Charter Academy
 Madison Preparatory Academy
 Mentorship STEM Academy
 South Baton Rouge Charter Academy
 University View Academy

East Feliciana Parish
 Slaughter Community Charter School

Jefferson Parish 

 Athlos Academy of Jefferson Parish
 Dr. John Ochsner Discovery Health Sciences Academy
 Jefferson Chamber Foundation Academy
 Jefferson Rise Charter School
 Kenner Discovery Health Sciences Academy
 Laureate Academy Charter School
 Young Audiences Charter School

Lafayette Parish

 Renaissance Charter Academy (Acadiana, Lafayette)
 Willow Charter Academy

Lafourche Parish

 Bayou Community Academy Charter School
 MAX Charter School
 Virtual Academy of Lafourche

Lincoln Parish
 Lincoln Preparatory School

Morehouse Parish
 Beekman Charter School

Orleans Parish

 Abramson Sci Academy
 Akili Academy of New Orleans
 Arise Academy
 Arthur Ashe Charter School
 Audubon Charter School (Gentilly, Uptown)
 Benjamin Franklin Elementary Mathematics & Science School
 Benjamin Franklin High School
 Bricolage Academy
 Dr. Martin Luther King Charter School for Science Tech
 Edward Hynes Charter School
 Einstein Charter Schools (Charter Middle, Sarah T. Reed, Sherwood Forest, Village de L'Est)
 Elan Academy Charter School
 Encore Academy
 Esperanza Charter School
 Fannie C. Williams Charter School
 Firstline Live Oak
 Foundation Preparatory School
 G.W. Carver High School
 Harriet Tubman Charter School
 Homer A. Plessy Community School
 IDEA Schools (Oscar Dunn)
 InspireNOLA (42, Alice M. Harte, Andrew H. Wilson, Dwight D. Eisenhower, Edna Karr, Eleanor McMain, McDonogh 35, Pierre Capdau)
 International High School of New Orleans
 International School of Louisiana
 James A. Singleton Charter School
 Joseph A. Craig Charter School
 KIPP New Orleans (Believe, Booker T. Washington, Central City, East, Frederick A. Douglass, John F. Kennedy, Leadership, Memorial)
 Lafayette Academy
 Lake Area New Tech Early College High School
 Lake Forest Elementary Charter School
 Langston Hughes Charter Academy
 Lanier Elementary School
 Lawrence D. Crocker College Prep
 L.B. Landry-O.P. Walker College & Career Preparatory High School
 Living School
 Livingston Collegiate Academy
 Lusher Charter School
 Lycée Français de la Nouvelle-Orléans
 Martin Behrman Elementary School
 Mary Bethune Elementary School of Literature & Technology
 Mary D. Coghill Charter School
 Mildred Osborne Charter School
 Morris Jeff Community School
 Nelson Elementary School
 The Net Charter High School I/II
 New Harmony High Institute
 New Orleans Charter Science & Mathematics High School
 New Orleans Military & Maritime Academy
 Noble Minds
 Opportunities Academy
 Paul Habans Charter School
 Phillis Wheatley Community School
 ReNew Schools (Dolores T. Aaron, Schaumburg, Scitech)
 Robert Russa Moton Elementary School
 Rooted School
 Rosenwald Collegiate Academy
 Samuel J. Green Charter School
 Sophie B. Wright Institute of Academic Excellence
 Success Preparatory Academy
 Walter L. Cohen High School
 Warren Easton Charter High School
 Wilson Charter School

Ouachita Parish
 New Vision Learning Academy

Plaquemines Parish

 Belle Chasse Academy
 Iberville Charter Academy

Richland Parish
 Delhi Charter School

St. James Parish
 Greater Grace Charter Academy

St. Landry Parish
 J.S. Clark Leadership Academy

St. Mary Parish
 V.B. Glencoe Charter School

Union Parish

 D'Arbonne Woods Charter School
 Downsville Community Charter School

Washington Parish
 Northshore Charter School

References 

Charter
School districts